Solemyidae is a family of saltwater clams, marine protobranch bivalve mollusks in the order Solemyida.

Biology
Solemyids are remarkable in that their digestive tract is either extremely small or non-existent, and their feeding appendages are too short to reach outside the shell.

It has been shown that these clams host sulphur-oxidizing bacteria intracellularly within their gill filaments. As chemoautotrophs, these bacterial symbionts synthesize organic matter from CO2 and are the primary source of nutrition for the whole organism. In turn, the animal host provides its symbionts a habitat in which they have access to the substrates of chemoautotrophy (O2, CO2, and reduced inorganic compounds such as H2S). Together, these partners create "animals" with novel metabolic capabilities.

Genera and species
The family Solemyidae includes two genera and the following species: 
 Acharax Dall, 1908 
 Acharax alinae  Métivier & Cosel, 1993
 Acharax bartschii  (Dall, 1908)
 Acharax caribbaea  (Vokes, 1970)
 Acharax clarificata  Dell, 1995
 Acharax gadirae  Oliver, Rodrigues & Cunha, 2011
 Acharax grandis  (Verrill & Bush, 1898)
 Acharax japonica  (Dunker, 1882)
 Acharax johnsoni  (Dall, 1891)
 Acharax patagonica  (E. A. Smith, 1885)
 Acharax prashadi  (Vokes, 1955)
 Solemya Lamarck, 1818 
 Solemya africana  Martens, 1880
 Solemya atacama  (Kuznetzov & Schileyko, 1984)
 Solemya australis  Lamarck, 1818
 Solemya borealis  Totten, 1834
 Solemya elarraichensis  Oliver, Rodrigues & Cunha, 2011
 Solemya flava  Sato, Sasaki & Watanabe, 2013
 Solemya moretonensis  Taylor, Glover & Williams, 2008
 Solemya notialis  Simone, 2009
 Solemya occidentalis  Deshayes, 1857
 Solemya panamensis  Dall, 1908
 Solemya parkinsonii  E. A. Smith, 1874
 Solemya pervernicosa  (Kuroda, 1948)
 Solemya pusilla  Gould, 1861
 Solemya tagiri  Okutani, Hashimoto & Miura, 2004
 Solemya terraereginae  Iredale, 1929
 Solemya togata  (Poli, 1791)
 Solemya valvulus  Carpenter, 1864
 Solemya velesiana  Iredale, 1931
 Solemya velum  Say, 1822
 Solemya winckworthi  Prashad, 1932

References

 
Environmental microbiology
Bivalve families
Chemosynthetic symbiosis
Taxa named by John Edward Gray